Mark Isaiah Robinson (born August 14, 1999) is an American football linebacker for the Pittsburgh Steelers of the National Football League (NFL). He played college football at Presbyterian before transferring to Southeast Missouri State and then to Ole Miss.

Professional career
Robinson was selected in the seventh round, 225th overall, of the 2022 NFL Draft by the Pittsburgh Steelers.

References

External links
 Pittsburgh Steelers bio
 Presbyterian Blue Hose bio
 Southeast Missouri State Redhawks bio
 Ole Miss Rebels bio

1999 births
Living people
American football linebackers
Presbyterian Blue Hose football players
Southeast Missouri State Redhawks football players
Ole Miss Rebels football players
Pittsburgh Steelers players